The spotted-belly catshark (Atelomycterus erdmanni) is a catshark of the family Scyliorhinidae. It is found in eastern Indonesia. This species differs from Atelomycterus baliensis in having white spots present over the body a larger first dorsal fin, paired fins closer together, and pelvic fin farther apart from the ventral caudal-fin origin. A. erdmanni differs from Atelomycterus marmoratus in having far less numerous white spotting  a larger first dorsal fin, and the clasper glans about half length of clasper outer margin.

References

spotted-belly catshark
Fish of Indonesia
spotted-belly catshark